Glyphipterix octonaria is a species of sedge moth in the genus Glyphipterix. It was described by Alfred Philpott, 1924. It is found in New Zealand.

References

Moths described in 1924
Glyphipterigidae
Moths of New Zealand
Endemic fauna of New Zealand
Taxa named by Alfred Philpott
Endemic moths of New Zealand